The 2021–22 season was the 118th season in the existence of Galatasaray and the club's 64th consecutive season in the top flight of Turkish football. In addition to the domestic league, Galatasaray participated in this season's edition of the Turkish Cup, the UEFA Champions League and the UEFA Europa League.

Overview

June 2021
Galatasaray Sports Club elected its 38th president at the Ordinary Elective General Assembly held on 19 June 2021. Burak Elmas became the new president of the Yellow-Red Club.

August 2021
In the statement made on 19 August 2021, the Professional Football Disciplinary Committee of the Turkish Football Federation banned Marcão from 8 official matches and fined 21.000 Turkish Liras, for inflicting violence on his teammate Kerem Aktürkoğlu in the match between Galatasaray and Giresunspor in the Süper Lig.

September 2021
In the first week of the Süper Lig, the yellow and red club announced that the Brazilian football player was fined for Marcão, who attacked Kerem Aktürkoğlu in the match played with Giresunspor. In the information made by the club on 2 September 2021, Galatasaray Sportif A.Ş. It was announced that with the decision taken by the Board of Directors, a fine of 150,000 Euros was imposed.

October 2021
In the statement made on 12 October 2021, a sponsorship and advertising promotion agreement regarding stadium naming rights worth 725.000.000 Turkish Liras + VAT for a total of 10 (5+5) seasons, including 5 seasons, was signed between Galatasaray Sports Club and Timur Şehircilik Planning A.Ş. In accordance with this agreement, the name of the stadium, which was Türk Telekom Stadium, was changed to Nef Stadium.

November 2021
In a statement made on 25 November 2021, the Turkish Football Federation Professional Football Disciplinary Committee announced that Fatih Terim, who received a red card in the Fenerbahçe derby, was banned for 5 matches and fined 29,500 Turkish Liras. Terim will not be at the head of his team in 6 matches with the penalty he received from a double yellow card.

December 2021
Galatasaray Sports Club Vice President and Galatasaray Sportif A.Ş. Acting Chairman, Attorney Doctor Rezan Epözdemir announced on 15 December 2021 that he resigned from these duties and membership of the board of directors for personal reasons.

Galatasaray Sports Club General Secretary Şükrü Köksal Ünlü announced on 16 December 2021 that he resigned from this position and from the board of directors due to personal reasons.

In the statement made by Galatasaray Sports Club on 17 December 2021, Galatasaray Sports Club Association Vice President and Galatasaray Sportif A.Ş. Acting Chairman, Lawyer Doctor Rezan Epözdemir, on 15 December 2021 and Galatasaray Sports Club Association General Secretary Şükrü Köksal Ünlü resigned from their duties and all board memberships on 16 December 2021, with the common opinion of the Board of Directors and in accordance with the Bylaws, Ibrahim, one of the alternate members of the Board of Directors of Galatasaray Sports Club Association. It has been announced that Reha Keskin and Ahmet Ozan Şener will serve as members of the Board of Directors.

January 2022
In the official statement made on 10 January 2022, Galatasaray manager Fatih Terim was sacked from his post after meeting with President Burak Elmas at Nef Stadium. On 11 January 2022, Elmas confirmed during a press conference the new manager Domènec Torrent. The same evening Torrent arrived in Istanbul to sign his new contract with the club.

On 14 January 2022, Domènec Torrent and his assistants Jordi Guerrero signed their contract with Jordi Gris Vila Florya Metin Oktay Facilities.

February 2022
Hakan Balta, who has been serving as the Assistant Administrative Director of the Football A Team as of 8 February 2022, has been appointed as the Technical Director of the Galatasaray Under-19 Football Team.

Club

Board of Directors
You can see the fields of the board members by moving the pointer to the dotted field.

Facilities

|}

Kits
Galatasaray's 2021–22 kits, manufactured by Nike, released on 14 July 2021 and were up for sale on the same day.

Supplier: Nike
Main sponsor: Sixt

Back sponsor: Nesine.com
Sleeve sponsor: Getir

Short sponsor: Bitget
Socks sponsor: Tunç Holding

Management team

Terim coaching staff (until 10 January 2022)

Torrent coaching staff (from 11 January 2022)

Players

Squad information
Players and squad numbers last updated on 20 May 2022. Appearances include all competitions.Note: Flags indicate national team as has been defined under FIFA eligibility rules. Players may hold more than one non-FIFA nationality.

Transfers

Contracts renewals

In

Summer

Winter

Loan in

Summer

Winter

Out

Summer

Winter

Loan out

Summer

Winter

Overall transfer activity

Expenditure
Summer: 

Winter: 

Total:

Income
Summer: 

Winter: 

Total:

Net totals
Summer: 

Winter: 

Total:

Pre-season and friendlies

Pre-season

Mid-season

Competitions

Overall record

Süper Lig

League table

Results summary

Results by round

Matches

Turkish Cup

UEFA Champions League

Second qualifying round

UEFA Europa League

Third qualifying round

Play-off round

Group stage

The group stage draw was held on 27 August 2021.

Knockout phase

Round of 16
The draw for the round of 16 was held on 25 February 2022.

Statistics

Appearances and goals

Goalscorers

Assists

Clean sheets

Disciplinary record

Injury record

References

External links

Galatasaray S.K. (football) seasons
Galatasaray
Galatasaray
Galatasaray
2021 in Istanbul
2022 in Istanbul
Galatasaray Sports Club 2021–22 season